Over the Rise may refer to:

"Over the Rise", a song by Big Audio on their 1994 album Higher Power
"Over the Rise", a song by Bruce Hornsby and the Noisemakers on their 2016 album Rehab Reunion
"Over the Rise", a song by Bruce Springsteen on his 1998 album Tracks